Emilia Clarke is an English actress. Clarke's first credited television role was a bit part in the BBC One series Doctors in 2009. She appeared in the 2010 television film Triassic Attack and was named a Star of Tomorrow by the film magazine Screen International. She was subsequently cast as Daenerys Targaryen in the HBO series Game of Thrones in 2010, a role for which she was nominated for the Primetime Emmy Award for Outstanding Supporting Actress in a Drama Series three times (2013, 2015, and 2016) and Primetime Emmy Award for Outstanding Lead Actress in a Drama Series for the final season in 2019. Clarke won the Saturn Award for Best Actress on Television in 2019. She also, along with the other Game of Thrones cast members, received the Empire Hero Award in 2015 and seven nominations for the Screen Actors Guild Award for Outstanding Performance by an Ensemble in a Drama Series (2012, 2014–2018, and 2020).

Clarke played Sarah Connor in the 2015 science fiction action film Terminator Genisys for which she received a nomination for the Teen Choice Award for Choice Female Summer Movie Star. She starred alongside Sam Claflin in the 2016 romantic drama film Me Before You, which gained them nominations for a MTV Movie & TV Award and Teen Choice Award for their performances. For her role of Qi'ra in the 2018 film Solo: A Star Wars Story, she was nominated for Favorite Butt-Kicker at the 2019 Kids' Choice Awards. In 2019, Time magazine recognised Clarke as one of the 100 most influential people in the world in the "Artist" category. She also won the Britannia Award for British Artist of the Year at the 2018 ceremony. Clarke has also been honoured for her charitable work. In 2019, she won the Shorty Do Good Award for Best Comedy Video for a video she made to spread awareness of her charity SameYou and the Royal College of Nursing.

Awards and nominations

Footnotes

References

External links 
 List of awards and nominations at IMDb

Clarke, Emilia